Karighatta Road is the road connecting Srirangapatna town in Mandya district with the Bannur town in Mysore district, Karnataka state, India.

Highlights
The Karighatta Road is also called Srirangapatna-Bannur Road.  In Bannur, this road is called S.R.P.Road. The entire stretch of the road goes by the northern side of the Cauvery River.

Image gallery

See also
 Bannur
 Srirangapatna
 Karighatta Temple

References

Roads in Mandya district